Yankee is a 2019 Mexican Spanish-language streaming television drama series created by Diego Enrique Osorno and starring Julio Casado, Sebastián Ferrat and Jana Raluy. The plot revolves around Malcolm Moriarty (Pablo Lyle), a young entrepreneur from Arizona who is on the run from the police. He crosses the border into Mexico and gets involved in drug dealing with modern technology, becoming their American associate.

It was ordered direct-to-series, and the first season premiered on Netflix streaming on June 14, 2019.

Cast
 Pablo Lyle as Malcolm Moriarty
 Sebastián Ferrat as Cara Sucia
 Julio Casado as Del Toro
 Jana Raluy as Governor Nelly
 Ana Layevska as Laura Wolf
 Pamela Almanza as Phoebe Moriarty
 Aldo Verástegui as Alacrán

Release
The full first season consisting of 25 episodes premiered on Netflix streaming on June 14, 2019.

References

External links
 
 
 

Spanish-language Netflix original programming
Works about Mexican drug cartels